Judith DelZoppo Pryor is an American businesswoman currently serving as the vice president of the Export-Import Bank of the United States (EXIM). She previously served on its board of directors during the Trump administration.

Early life and education
Pryor holds a B.A. in Communication from Bowling Green State University and served on the BGSU Foundation Board from 2016 to 2019.

Career
Pryor previously worked with companies in the satellite industry including WorldSpace Satellite Radio and COMSAT.

Obama administration
Pryor previously served in the Obama-Biden Administration at the International Development Finance Corporation (formerly OPIC). As the Vice President for External Affairs, she oversaw congressional and public affairs, communications, and U.S. small business development.

EXIM under Trump
On October 3, 2017, President Donald Trump nominated Pryor to be a member of the board of directors of EXIM. She was confirmed by the Senate on May 8, 2019, by a vote of 77–19.

Pryor started her position on May 10, 2019.

Tenure
Pryor's area of focus encompasses Africa and the Middle East, renewable energy, storage and efficiency, and women and minority-owned businesses.

EXIM under Biden
On July 19, 2021, President Joe Biden nominated Pryor to be the Vice President of EXIM. She was confirmed by the Senate on March 30, 2022, by a vote of 69–30.

Pryor began serving in her new role on April 5, 2022.

Personal life
Pryor is a native of Cleveland, Ohio. She resides in Washington, DC with her husband and son.

References

Obama administration personnel
Trump administration personnel
Biden administration personnel
Living people
Bowling Green State University alumni
Export–Import Bank of the United States people
Year of birth missing (living people)
Place of birth missing (living people)